Bihar was a Khagan of the Khazars during the 730s. Bihar was the father of Tzitzak, the Khazar princess who married the son of Byzantine Emperor Leo III who later ruled as Constantine V. Bihar was thus the grandfather of Emperor Leo IV the Khazar. He is called Viharos in Armenian sources.

References

Khazar rulers
8th-century rulers in Europe
8th-century Turkic people